Oliver Eustace Tidman (16 May 1911 – 20 December 2000) was a former English footballer who played as an outside left.

Career
In 1932, Tidman signed for Aston Villa from Tufnell Park. On 11 February 1933, Tidman made his only appearance for the club in a 1–0 away win against Chelsea. In 1935, Tidman signed for Stockport County, making 24 Football League appearances, scoring four times. In 1936, Tidman signed for Bristol Rovers, making 16 league appearances, scoring once. Tidman later played for Clapton Orient and Chelmsford City, signing for each club in 1937 and 1938 respectively.

References

1911 births
2000 deaths 
Association football wingers
English footballers
People from Margate
Middlesex Wanderers A.F.C. players
Tufnell Park F.C. players
Aston Villa F.C. players
Stockport County F.C. players
Bristol Rovers F.C. players
Leyton Orient F.C. players
Chelmsford City F.C. players
English Football League players